Elaia (Bulgarian: Делиелес - Delieles) is a village in the northern part of the Evros regional unit, Greece. Elaia is in the municipal unit of Trigono. In 2011 its population was 428. The village is located on the left bank of the river Arda. The nearest villages are Plati to its northeast and Fylakio to its south.

Population

History
The village was founded during the Ottoman period by the Turks, its population was Bulgarian and Turkish. After its annexation to Greece, many Greeks from east of the Evros river began to inhabit the area.

See also

List of settlements in the Evros regional unit

External links
Elaiaon GTP Travel Pages

References

Trigono
Populated places in Evros (regional unit)